The 2017 Scottish local elections were held on Thursday 4 May, in all 32 local authorities.  The SNP retained its position as the largest party in terms of votes and councillors, despite suffering minor losses. The Conservatives made gains and displaced Labour as the second largest party, while the Liberal Democrats suffered a net loss of councillors despite increasing their share of the vote. Minor parties and independents polled well; and independent councillors retained majority control over the three island councils. For the first time since the local government reforms in 1995, all mainland councils fell under no overall control.

Background

The previous election was in 2012. Normally these elections take place every four years, but this election was postponed for a year in order to avoid conflicting with the 2016 Scottish Parliament election.

Once again the local elections, held under the Single Transferable Vote system, were counted electronically, using the same system used in 2012. The tender was awarded to CGI (formerly Logica) and Idox Elections (formerly Opt2vote), both of which delivered the 2012 elections successfully.

Eligibility to vote 

All registered electors (British, Irish, Commonwealth and European Union citizens) who were aged 16 or over on polling day were entitled to vote in the local elections. A person who had two homes (such as a university student who has a term-time address and lives at home during holidays) could register to vote at both addresses as long as they are not in the same electoral area and can vote for two different councils, albeit only in two different local elections; however, it is an offence to vote twice in the same type of election and doing so may incur a fine of up to £5,000.

Individuals must have registered to vote by midnight twelve working days before polling day (17 April 2017). Anyone who qualified as an anonymous elector had until midnight on 25 April 2017 to register.

Party performance 
Following the election, SNP leader Nicola Sturgeon played down the threat posed by the Conservatives to her party, asserting that the good performance by the Conservatives was on account of Labour support going to the Conservatives and not because of any shift in SNP voters.

Scottish Conservative leader Ruth Davidson asserted a "Scottish fightback against the SNP" and said that the results represented a resurgence for the Conservatives, despite the fact that the SNP's 1st preference vote percentage had not changed since the 2012 election.

Scottish Labour leader Kezia Dugdale admitted the results were disappointing for her party, while the Scottish Liberal Democrats leader Willie Rennie said the council results showed his party could stand against the SNP tide in key northern constituencies.

Aftermath

Aberdeenshire

The Scottish Conservatives returned the most councillors, the first time it has been the largest party in the region since the 1982 election, when the area was under the Grampian Regional Council, although they were stopped short of an overall majority. The number of Scottish National Party councillors fell by a quarter but remained the second largest group. The Scottish Liberal Democrats picked up a couple of seats while the other parties gained roughly the same results as the previous election.

On 18 May, the Conservatives, Liberal Democrats and Aligned Independents formed an administration, with Jim Gifford (Conservative) elected as council leader and Bill Howatson (Liberal Democrat) was made Provost.

Argyll and Bute

The SNP became the largest party on the council for the first time, as the Independent group lost a third of its seats compared to the previous election. The Conservatives gained five seats and the Liberal Democrats gained two, but both remained in their respective places as the two smaller parties.

Despite the SNP's position, a coalition was formed of Conservatives, Liberal Democrats and Independents, referred to as The Argyll Lomond and the Isles Group (TALIG). Aileen Morton, leader of the group, was elected as council leader.

Fife

The Scottish National Party replaced Scottish Labour as the largest party for the first time in the Fife region, although they did not gain enough seats to form a majority. The Scottish Conservatives made the most gains, replacing the Scottish Liberal Democrats as the third biggest party. The election also returned no Independent councillors, marking the first time the area will be without any Independent representation since the creation of Fife Regional Council in 1974.

On 18 May, the two largest parties of the new council, the SNP and Scottish Labour, signed a Power Sharing Agreement to co-run an administration. David Alexander (SNP) and David Ross (Labour) were made co-leaders, and Jim Leishman remained in his role as Provost.

Glasgow

The SNP replaced Labour as the biggest party; although without a majority it ended Labour's 37-year-long control of the council. The Conservatives increased its number of councillors from 1 to 8, their highest since 1984, while the Scottish Green Party also made a couple of gains to reach their highest ever level in Glasgow. This council is the first without any Liberal representation since 1974.

The SNP took control of the council as a minority administration with SNP members filling the positions of council leader, depute council leader, and Lord Provost.

Councils

Opinion polling

Results

|-style="background-color:#E9E9E9;text-align:center;"
!colspan="2" rowspan="2" width="175"|Party
!colspan="3" rowspan="2" width="175"| First-preference votes
! scope="col" rowspan="2"| Councils
! scope="col" rowspan="2" style="width: 30px;"| +/-
! colspan="2" | 2012 seats
! colspan="2" | 2017 seats
! colspan="2" | Seat change
|-
! Seats won
!  Notional
!  Seats won
! Seat %
!  vs Notional
|-
|- style="text-align:right;"
| style="background-color:"|
| style="text-align:left;" |SNP
|610,454
|32.3%
| 0.0%
|0
|style="background-color:#ffe8e8;"| 1
|425
|438
|431
|35.1%
|style="background-color:#ffe8e8;"| 7
|- style="text-align:right;"
| style="background-color:"|
| style="text-align:left;" |Conservative
|478,073
|25.3%
| 12.0%
|0
| 
|115
|112
|276
|22.5%
|style="background-color:#dfd"| 164
|- style="text-align:right;"
| style="background-color:"|
| style="text-align:left;" |Labour
|380,957
|20.2%
| 11.4%
|0
|style="background-color:#ffe8e8;"| 3
|394
|395
|262
|21.4%
|style="background-color:#ffe8e8;"| 133
|-
|- style="text-align:right;"
| style="background-color:"|
| style="text-align:left;" |Independents
|196,438
|10.4%
| 1.4%
|3
| 
|196
|198
|168
|14.1%
|style="background-color:#ffe8e8;"| 30
|- style="text-align:right;"
| style="background-color:"|
| style="text-align:left;" |Liberal Democrats
|130,243
|6.9%
| 0.3%
|0
| 
|71
|70
|67
|5.5%
|style="background-color:#ffe8e8;"| 3
|- style="text-align:right;"
| style="background-color:"|
| style="text-align:left;" |Green
|77,682
|4.1%
| 1.8%
|0
| 
|14
|14
|19
|1.6%
|style="background-color:#dfd"| 5
|- style="text-align:right;"
| style="background-color:"|
| style="text-align:left;" |Orkney Manifesto Group
|894
|0.0%
|
|0
|
|
|
|2
|0.1%
|style="background-color:#dfd"| New
|- style="text-align:right;"
| style="background-color:"|
| style="text-align:left;" |West Dunbartonshire Community
|2,413
|0.1%
|
|0
|
|
|
|1
|0.1%
|style="background-color:#dfd"| New
|- style="text-align:right;"
| style="background-color:"|
| style="text-align:left;" |The Rubbish Party
|784
|0.0%
|
|0
|
|
|
|1
|0.1%
|style="background-color:#dfd"| New
|- style="text-align:right;"
| style="background-color:"|
| style="text-align:left;" |UKIP
|2,920
|0.2%
|0.1%
|0
|
|
|
|
|0.0%
|
|- style="text-align:right;"
|
| style="text-align:left;" |Independent Alliance North Lanarkshire
|2,823
|0.2%
|
|0
|
|
|
|
|0.0%
|
|- style="text-align:right;"
| style="background-color:"|
| style="text-align:left;" |TUSC
|1,403
|0.1%
|
|0
|
|
|
|
|0.0%
|
|- style="text-align:right;"
| style="background-color:"|
| style="text-align:left;" |A Better Britain – Unionist Party
|1,196
|0.1%
|
|0
|
|
|
|
|0.0%
|
|- style="text-align:right;"
| style="background-color:"|
| style="text-align:left;" |Scottish Socialist
|928
|0.0%
|0.3%
|0
|
|1
|
|0
|0.0%
|style="background-color:#ffe8e8;"| 1
|- style="text-align:right;"
| style="background-color:"|
| style="text-align:left;" |Solidarity
|883
|0.0%
|
|0
|
|
|
|
|0.0%
|
|- style="text-align:right;"
| style="background-color:"|
| style="text-align:left;" |Libertarian
|776
|0.0%
|
|0
|
|
|
|
|0.0%
|
|- style="text-align:right;"
| style="background-color:"|
| style="text-align:left;" |RISE
|186
|0.0%
|
|0
|
|
|
|
|0.0%
|
|- style="text-align:right;"
|
| style="text-align:left;" |Scottish Independent Network
|145
|0.0%
|
|0
|
|
|
|
|0.0%
|
|- style="text-align:right;"
| style="background-color:"|
| style="text-align:left;" |Scottish Unionist
|129
|0.0%
|
|0
|
|
|
|
|0.0%
|
|- style="text-align:right;"
| style="background-color:"|
| style="text-align:left;" |Social Democratic
|112
|0.0%
|
|0
|
|
|
|
|0.0%
|
|- style="text-align:right;"
| style="background-color:"|
| style="text-align:left;" |Scottish Christian
|104
|0.0%
|
|0
|
|
|
|
|0.0%
|
|- style="text-align:right;"
| style="background-color:"|
| style="text-align:left;" |Socialist Labour
|76
|0.0%
|
|0
|
|
|
|
|0.0%
|
|- style="text-align:right;"
| style="background-color:"|
| style="text-align:left;" |National Front
|39
|0.0%
|
|0
|
|
|
|
|0.0%
|
|-
|- style="text-align:right;"
| style="background-color:"|
| style="text-align:left;" |No Overall Control
| —
| —
| —
| 29
|style="background-color:#dfd;"| 4
| —
| —
| —
| —
| —
|-
! colspan="2" style="text-align:left;" |Total
|style="background-color:#E9E9E9;text-align:right;" | 1,889,658
|style="background-color:#E9E9E9;text-align:right;" |100.0
|style="background-color:#E9E9E9;text-align:right;" | ±0.0
|style="background-color:#E9E9E9;text-align:right;" |32
|style="background-color:#E9E9E9;text-align:right;" | 
|style="background-color:#E9E9E9;text-align:right;" |1,223
|style="background-color:#E9E9E9;text-align:right;" |1,227
|style="background-color:#E9E9E9;text-align:right;" |1,227
|style="background-color:#E9E9E9;text-align:right;" | 100.00
|style="background-color:#E9E9E9;text-align:right;" | 
|}
<noinclude>
The table has been arranged according to popular vote, not the number of seats won.

Boundary changes
Prior to the 2017 elections, changes were made to council ward boundaries in 25 council areas. This meant that comparisons with the actual results from 2012 were inaccurate due to a small increase in the total number of seats (from 1,223 to 1,227), different boundaries, and some wards having their number of councillors adjusted. These changes led BBC News, using work done by Professor David Denver of Lancaster University, to estimate what the results would have been in 2012 if the new boundaries and seat numbers had been in place for that election.

Analysis

See also
2017 United Kingdom local elections
2017 Welsh local elections
2017 Northern Ireland Assembly election

Further reading

Notes and references

Notes

References

External links
Elections Scotland summary of results 
Scottish Council election May 2017

 
Council elections in Scotland
Scotland